The women's tournament was won by the team representing .

Preliminary round

Source: Paralympic.org

Medal round

Source: Paralympic.org

Classification 5-8

Source: Paralympic.org

Ranking

References

Women
2004 in women's basketball
International women's basketball competitions hosted by Greece